Tom Eckert is a former American football player and coach. He served as the head football coach at Northeastern State University in Tahlequah, Oklahoma from 1987 to 2002, compiling a record of 101–71–3. During that time, he led his team to the NCAA Division II playoffs in 1999 and 2000.

Eckert played professional football for one season as a quarterback for the Tulsa Oilers of the Texas Football League in 1966.

Head coaching record

College

References

Year of birth missing (living people)
Living people
American football quarterbacks
Florida State Seminoles football players
Hardin–Simmons Cowboys football players
Northeastern State RiverHawks football players
Northeastern State RiverHawks football coaches
High school football coaches in Kansas